Fabio Castellano (born 14 March 1998) is an Italian professional footballer who plays as a midfielder for  club Fidelis Andria on loan from Imolese.

Castellano began his footballing career with Atalanta, who he joined at the age of six, but never played for the club at senior level, instead making his professional debut while on loan at Pro Vercelli before signing for Ascoli in 2017.

Club career

Atalanta
Fabio Castellano is an academy graduate of Atalanta F.C, having joined the club when he was just six years old. In 2014, he was the subject of great media coverage after he rejected offers from Manchester United, Chelsea, Inter, and A.C. Milan in order to remain with Atalanta.

Loan to Pro Vercelli
In July 2016, Serie B side Pro Vercelli confirmed the loan signing of Castellano. He made his debut for the club on 22 October, coming on as an 80th minute substitute for Simone Emmanuello in a 3–0 loss to Hellas Verona. In January 2017, reports circulated that Atalanta had reached an agreement with Juventus for the sale of Castellano, with the player to remain with Pro Vercelli for the remainder of the season. It was later revealed, however, that Atalanta and Juventus had failed to submit the requisite documents before the transfer market had closed. His only other appearance, which also marked his first professional start, came on the final day of the season in a 2–1 defeat to Frosinone which saw Pro Vercelli end the campaign in 17th position, narrowly avoiding relegation.

Ascoli
On 30 August 2017, Castellano signed for Serie B side Ascoli on a three-year contract. He made his debut for the club on 17 March 2018, coming on as a late substitute in a 2–1 win over Ternana.

Loan to Juve Stabia
On 29 August 2018, he joined Serie C club Juve Stabia on loan for the 2018–19 season.

Alessandria
On 15 July 2019, he signed a 2-year contract with Serie C club Alessandria.

Livorno
On 1 February 2021, he moved to Livorno.

Pistoiese
On 25 August 2021 he joined Padova, and was loaned to Pistoiese.

Imolese

Loan to Fidelis Andria
On 31 January 2023, Castellano was loaned by Fidelis Andria.

International career

Italy national youth teams
Castellano has represented Italy across various youth levels. He made his debut for the Italy U18 side alongside Atalanta teammate Simone Mazzocchi on 13 August 2015 in a 0–0 draw with Bulgaria.

Career statistics

Club

References

1998 births
Living people
Footballers from Milan
Italian footballers
Italy youth international footballers
Association football midfielders
Serie B players
Serie C players
Atalanta B.C. players
F.C. Pro Vercelli 1892 players
Ascoli Calcio 1898 F.C. players
S.S. Juve Stabia players
U.S. Alessandria Calcio 1912 players
U.S. Livorno 1915 players
Calcio Padova players
U.S. Pistoiese 1921 players
Imolese Calcio 1919 players
S.S. Fidelis Andria 1928 players